Fenusa pumila, the birch leafminer, is a species of sawfly in the family Tenthredinidae. It is found in Europe and has been introduced into North America.

References

Tenthredinidae
Hymenoptera of Europe
Taxa named by William Elford Leach
Insects described in 1817